Hakea hookeriana, commonly known as the Barren Range hakea, is a shrub of the genus Hakea native to Western Australia.

Description

It produces red brown or white or cream-yellow flowers from September to January. Each inflorescence is umbelliform containing five, seven or nine flowers with obscure rachis. Within the fruits are obovate shaped seeds with a wing down a single side.

Taxonomy and naming
H. hookeriana was first formally described by Carl Meissner in 1856 as part of Augustin Pyramus de Candolle's work Prodromus Systematis Naturalis Regni Vegetabilis.
The species is named for William Jackson Hooker.

Distribution and habitat
Hakea hookeriana is found in an area in weastern part of Fitzgerald River National Park along the south coast of the Goldfields-Esperance region of Western Australia where it is found among rocks and rocky outcrops on cliffs and gullies growing in quartzite soils. It is often part of scrubland communities including Banksia heliantha.

References

hookeriana
Flora of Western Australia
Plants described in 1856